Textual variants in the New Testament manuscripts arise when a copyist makes deliberate or inadvertent alterations to the text that is being reproduced. Textual criticism of the New Testament has included study of its textual variants.

Most of the variations are not significant and some common alterations include the deletion, rearrangement, repetition, or replacement of one or more words when the copyist's eye returns to a similar word in the wrong location of the original text. If their eye skips to an earlier word, they may create a repetition (error of dittography). If their eye skips to a later word, they may create an omission. They may resort to performing a rearranging of words to retain the overall meaning without compromising the context. In other instances, the copyist may add text from memory from a similar or parallel text in another location. Otherwise, they may also replace some text of the original with an alternative reading. Spellings occasionally change. Synonyms may be substituted. A pronoun may be changed into a proper noun (such as "he said" becoming "Jesus said"). Most of these variants are not of any importance, since the meanings do not really change.

Origen, writing in the 3rd century, was one of the first who made remarks about differences between manuscripts of texts that were eventually collected as the New Testament. He declared his preferences among variant readings. For example, in Matthew 27:16–17, he favored "Barabbas" against "Jesus Barabbas" In John 1:28, he preferred "Bethabara" over "Bethany" as the location where John was baptizing. "Gergeza" was preferred over "Geraza" or "Gadara". At Hebrews 2:9, Origen noticed two different readings: "apart from God" and "by the grace of God".

John Mill's 1707 Greek New Testament was estimated to contain some 30,000 variants in its accompanying textual apparatus which was based on "nearly 100 [Greek] manuscripts." Eberhard Nestle estimated this number in 1897 as 150,000–200,000 variants. In 2005, Bart D. Ehrman reported estimates from 200,000 to 400,000 variants based on 5,700 Greek and 10,000 Latin manuscripts, various other ancient translations, and quotations by the Church Fathers. In 2014 Eldon J. Epp raised the estimate as high as 750,000. Peter J. Gurry puts the number of non-spelling variants among New Testament manuscripts around 500,000, though he acknowledges his estimate is higher than all previous ones.

Since 1981, in a system developed and introduced by Kurt and Barbara Aland in their textbook The Text of the New Testament, Greek New Testament manuscripts have commonly been categorized into five groups.

Below is an abbreviated list of textual variants in the New Testament.

Legend

Variants
This running list of textual variants is nonexhaustive, and is continually being updated in accordance with the modern critical publications of the Greek New Testament — United Bible Societies' Fifth Revised Edition (UBS5) published in 2014, Novum Testamentum Graece: Nestle-Aland 28th Revised Edition of the Greek New Testament (NA28) published in 2012, and Novum Testamentum Graecum: Editio Critica Maior (ECM) last published in 2017 — and supplemented by nonmodern publications wherever applicable, including those of Hodges & Farstad, Greeven, Lachmann, Legg, Merk, Nestle-Aland editions 25–27, Aland's Synopsis Quattuor Evangeliorum (SQE), Souter, Swanson, Tischendorf, Tregelles, von Soden, and Westcott & Hort.

Gospel of Matthew

Gospel of Mark

Gospel of Luke

Gospel of John

Acts of the Apostles

Epistle to the Romans

First Epistle to the Corinthians

Second Epistle to the Corinthians

Epistle to the Galatians

Epistle to the Ephesians

Epistle to the Philippians

Epistle to the Colossians

First Epistle to the Thessalonians

Second Epistle to the Thessalonians

First Epistle to Timothy

Second Epistle to Timothy

Epistle to Titus

Epistle to Philemon

Epistle to the Hebrews

Epistle of James

First Epistle of Peter

Second Epistle of Peter

First Epistle of John

Second Epistle of John

Third Epistle of John

Epistle of Jude

Book of Revelation

See also 
 Bible version debate
 Biblical inerrancy
 Caesarean text-type
 Categories of New Testament manuscripts
 Comparison of codices Sinaiticus and Vaticanus
 King James Only movement
 List of New Testament verses not included in modern English translations
 Modern English Bible translations
 The New Testament in the Original Greek
 Western text-type

References

Bibliography

Further reading 
 Novum Testamentum Graece et Latine, ed. E. Nestle, K. Aland, Stuttgart 1981.
 Bruce M. Metzger & Bart D. Ehrman, "The Text of the New Testament: Its Transmission, Corruption, and Restoration", OUP New York, Oxford, 4 edition, 2005
 Bart D. Ehrman, "The Orthodox Corruption of Scripture. The Effect of Early Christological Controversies on the Text of the New Testament", Oxford University Press, New York - Oxford, 1996, pp. 223–227.
 Bruce M. Metzger, "A Textual Commentary on the Greek New Testament: A Companion Volume to the United Bible Societies' Greek New Testament", 1994, United Bible Societies, London & New York.

External links 
 The Comparative Critical Greek New Testament
 Variantes textuais 
 Varianten Textus receptus versus Nestle-Aland
 The Gospel of John part of the Holy Bible

Biblical criticism
New Testament-related lists
Greek New Testament manuscripts
New Testament
Textual criticism